Fen Ditton Halt railway station served the village of Fen Ditton, Cambridgeshire, England from 1922 to 1962 on the Cambridge to Mildenhall railway.

History 
The station opened on 20 November 1922 by the Great Eastern Railway. It was situated on the west side of Ditton Lane. The station had oil lamps but in summer these were stored away because no trains ran when it went dark and they were later replaced with Tilley lamps. The station closed on 18 June 1962.

References

External links 

Disused railway stations in Cambridgeshire
Former Great Eastern Railway stations
Railway stations in Great Britain opened in 1922
Railway stations in Great Britain closed in 1962
1922 establishments in England
1962 disestablishments in England
Halt railway station